Stela Marian Pura (born 30 March 1971) is a retired Romanian swimmer who won three medals at the 1987 European Aquatics Championships. She also competed in four freestyle and butterfly events at the 1988 Summer Olympics and finished fourth in the 200 m butterfly.

References

1971 births
Living people
Swimmers at the 1988 Summer Olympics
Olympic swimmers of Romania
Romanian female butterfly swimmers
European Aquatics Championships medalists in swimming
Romanian female freestyle swimmers
Sportspeople from Baia Mare